Armentia is one of the villages associated with Vitoria-Gasteiz. Its name comes from the Latin word armentum, which translated into English means "intensive farming". The village is well known for its 161ha park created in the 1998.

Village

Armentia was a Spanish village in Álava, Basque Country and is at present one quarter of Vitoria-Gasteiz as a result of the city's expansion.

History

The village of Armentia was the most important religious centre in Álava in the late Middle Ages and as it was the see of the bishop, its church was the first cathedral in the Basque Country until the end of the 11th century, a time when the southern part of the Iberian peninsula was dominated by Muslim forces. Later, the bishop's see was moved to Calahorra.
Armentia was a strategic point on the communications networks in Roman and late medieval times and stood on the crossroads of two important routes: the Way of Saint James towards Gometxa, and the Roman road, which, after passing by the Mariturri Spring, headed towards Zuazo, and from there to Lermanda, Margarita and Iruña.

Basilica of San Prudencio

Armentia has one of the most important Romanesque churches dating from the 12th century in the province, which is the Basilica of San Prudencio de Armentia. References during the late Middle Ages describe it as the most important spiritual centre in Álava. The current building is twelfth century Romanesque and has a Latin cross plan, a transept and a semicircular apse.

Originally dedicated to Saint Andrew and built on the remains of an 8th-century church, it was refurbished in 1776, destroying part of its original structure, although it retained its apse and other isolated elements such as its original door. In 1964, it was restored once again and today is considered one of the most important examples of medieval art. The Basilica has been declared a monument of the Basque Country and it was declared Bien de Interés Cultural in 1931.

Built with a Latin cross layout, the vaults over the apse and crossing of its two arms are of special interest. The bases of the arches of the second of these vaults contain four sculptures of the evangelists. The capitals of the church are decorated with plant and animal motifs, as well as battle scenes between horsemen and centaurs. Its atrium contains the remains of the original doorway. After being dismantled, stones from the doorway were embedded in the walls in a disorderly fashion: the tympanum of the Lamb and that of Christ with the Apostles and the bas-reliefs of the Harrowing of Hell and the Sepulchre of Jesus, which represents one of the best Romanesque sculptural groups in the Basque Country.

The Basilica contains the image of San Prudencio (Saint Prudence), Bishop of Tarazona and Justice of the Peace in Osma, born in Armentia and Patron Saint of Álava from 1644. On April 28 each year, celebrations are held in his honour in the form of a procession and open-air festival, held on the meadows that surround the church.

St. James's Way crosses the city and exits Vitoria through the district of Armentia. Consequently, this basilica was directly on the pilgrims' route.

Population

Park

Armentia park consists of a large natural gall-oak wood, located between the city and the Mountains of Vitoria, the main mountain system and one of the most valuable natural spaces in the municipality of Vitoria-Gasteiz. It is precisely its location that converts the forest of Armentia into a real biological corridor between forested areas, the green periurban areas and the urban ecosystem, and this constitutes the main value of Armentia park.

Flora and fauna

A major feature of the Armentia park is its extensive covering of natural woodland (104 ha), representing more than 70% of its surface area. The dominating species of the forest of Armentia is the gall oak. The park has grown over the last 25 years with the plantation of a wide variety of tree species, distributed over 40 ha of land formerly used for farming.

The forest of Armentia contains a number of different environments. There are areas of thick vegetation in which, in addition to gall oaks, there are maples, hawthorns, blackthorns and  blackberry bushes, followed by areas of more scattered woodland with large clearings in some places, in which heather, badassi and juniper grow.

The Artetxo sitting area contains a number of outstanding examples of mature gall oaks with a curious candelabra-like shape, a consequence of pruning done over a number of years for firewood. On the ridges you can find beech, holly and rowan and along the edges of the small streams that flow through the park, maple, hazel and ash are very common.

The different environments that exist in the park are home to a rich and varied fauna including wild boars, squirrels, birds of prey and even about 30 species of small birds such as goldfinches, chaffinches, robins and great tits.

The environmental value of Armentia park consists of the fact that it is an ecological corridor between the green urban areas and the Mountains of Vitoria.

Development

The fires and excessive exploitation of the last two decades placed the forest of Armentia in a very precarious state of conservation. In 1974, the Provincial Council of Álava, the owner of this land, began work to improve the gall oak wood and thus initiated the creation of a botanical park in the deforested areas, including native species together with other, more exotic plants and trees. The maples, rowan trees, cypresses and many other species date from that period.

In the mid-90s, the wood showed clear signs of degradation such as the accumulation of rubbish, remains of bonfires, and excessive number of pathways and tracks and numerous eroded and flooded areas. The disorderly influx of visitors and especially vehicles were the main threat for the conservation of this park. The natural gall oak wood contained a large number of small, bushy trees with badly formed bases, and there were few well-developed mature trees.

After being included in the Green Belt, the first work consisted of restructuring the network of paths, improving the main tracks and closing the smaller ones, and the creation of a network of pathways for pedestrians, cyclists and horse riders. The degraded areas were restored, such as rubbish dumps, eroded areas and riverbanks. Additionally, car parks were prepared at the main entrances to the park and two sitting areas were created.

Work to maintain the wood has been and continues to be a key contributing factor to the healthy state of conservation that is apparent today in Armentia park.

Map and aerial views

Gallery

References

External links

 Vitoria-Gasteiz City Council - Green Belt
 Vitoria-Gasteiz City Council - Armentia park
 Tourism in Vitoria-Gasteiz - The Green Belt

Populated places in Álava
Vitoria-Gasteiz
Bien de Interés Cultural landmarks in Álava